Cassephyra cyanosticta is a moth of the family Geometridae first described by George Hampson in 1907. It is found in southern India.

References

Moths described in 1907
Ennominae